This page includes the discography of the Serbian artist Ana Stanić.

Albums

Studio albums

Compilation albums

Singles

Music videos

 1997 - "Molila sam anđele"
 1998 - "Točkovi"
 1998 - "Grad"
 1998 - "Sama"
 1999 - "Vidim te kad..."
 1999 - "Skrivanje"
 2000 - "Taj koji zna"
 2002 - "20,30 godina"
 2004 - "Pogrešan"
 2004 - "Trag ljubomore"
 2006 - "Udahni me"
 2007 - "Luda"
 2008 - "Više nisi moj"
 2008 - "Ljubav do neba"
 2009 - "I to je ljubav"
 2012 - "Panika"
 2014 - "Neka gori sve"

External links
Official Website
Ana Stanić on Discogs

Discographies of Serbian artists
Pop music discographies